Arrimal e Mendiga (officially União das Freguesias de Arrimal e Mendiga) is a civil parish in the municipality of Porto de Mós, Portugal. The population in 2021 was 1,575, in an area of 38.58 km2. It was formed on 28 January 2013 by the merging of freguesias Arrimal and Mendiga.

It is known for its natural beauty, being the home of the Serras de Aire e Candeeiros Natural Park and two natural lagoons.

References 

Parishes of Porto de Mós